When You Finish Saving the World is a 2022 American coming-of-age comedy-drama film written and directed by Jesse Eisenberg in his feature directorial debut. The film is based on Eisenberg's 2020 audio drama of the same name. Julianne Moore and Finn Wolfhard star as a mother and son who navigate their contentious relationship.

The film premiered at the Sundance Film Festival on January 20, 2022, and was released by A24 in the United States on January 20, 2023.

Plot 
 Indiana loner 17-year-old Ziggy Katz is a high school student who performs original folk-rock songs for an adoring online fan base. This concept mystifies his formal and uptight mother, Evelyn, who runs a shelter for survivors of domestic abuse. Ziggy installs a red rotating warning light outside his room to signal "do not disturb," which he begins to keep on constantly. Evelyn, feeling distant from her son, tries to convince him to come with her and volunteer at the shelter. He declines, saying he would make more money spending the time live streaming, sparking an argument where each accuse the other of being selfish. 

Ziggy begins falling for Lila, an activist classmate of his, and performs one of his songs at a local political arts festival to get closer to her. She reads a poem about the colonization of the Marshall Islands, which he compliments and borrows from her. That night, he masturbates while reading it, and later tries to set it to guitar. The next morning, he meets Lila and listens to her and her friends talking about current events. He tries to join in, but is laughed at by her friends for not knowing much about it. That night, he plays the song version of her poem to her. Impressed, she encourages him to use his live streaming platform for more political issues, which he rejects, saying it wouldn't turn a profit. 

Simultaneously, Evelyn meets Kyle, a 17-year-old who's staying with his mother at the shelter after he called the police to help get her out of an abusive home. Evelyn is impressed by his kindness and recruits him for volunteer jobs around the city, the two become close. Evelyn tries to get him a scholarship for college in Illinois, much to his mother's discontent, who would prefer he stayed working at his father's auto repair shop in town. 

That night, Ziggy's father, Roger, confronts the two for missing his awards ceremony at work: Evelyn had gone to dinner with Kyle after a volunteer event, and Ziggy was again at the arts festival. Each say they thought the other would be attending, and start arguing again. Roger storms off, saying they both should've come, something neither was willing to do with the other. The next morning, Ziggy asks his mother to give him a ride to school, and inquiers her on how he can learn to "be political" to impress Lila, and she scoffs, saying he doesn't really care about the causes. 

Evelyn walks into the school behind Ziggy, tracking down Kyle there and attempting to persuade him into going to college despite his mother's insistence. He appears uncomfortable at Evelyn's overbearingness, and says he'd rather stay with his mother than listen to her. In the next room, Ziggy reveals to Lila that he performed their song-poem online, and brags that he made $100 from it. She angrily accuses him of exploiting her work for profit and storms off, bewildering him. Just then, Evelyn turns the corner and sees him in the hallway. They empathetically make eye contact, both rejected.

Cast 
 Julianne Moore as Evelyn 
 Finn Wolfhard as Ziggy 
 Billy Bryk as Kyle
 Alisha Boe as Lila
 Jack Justice as Jackie
 Jay O. Sanders as Roger
 Eleonore Hendricks as Angie
 Catherine Haun as Cath
 Annacheska Brown as Cyril
 Sara Anne as Becky
Source:

Production 

On April 9, 2020, Jesse Eisenberg, Finn Wolfhard, and Kaitlyn Dever were cast in the Audible Original When You Finish Saving the World, written by Eisenberg. The story was told from the perspective of three family members, at different stages of their lives, with the audio drama released on August 4, 2020.

Additionally, the audiobook was planned to be adapted into a comedy-drama movie, When You Finish Saving the World, with Julianne Moore and Wolfhard set to star as mother and son, directed and written by Eisenberg with Moore, Emma Stone and Dave McCary producing under their Fruit Tree production banner. The film adaptation was to take place in the present day and focus on the mother and son relationship, while keeping other details the same, such as Ziggy's mother running a shelter for victims of domestic violence, which she does in the audio version as well.

In August 2020, it was announced that A24 was set to finance, produce and distribute the film. It marks Eisenberg's feature film directorial debut. Moore and Wolfhard were confirmed as cast as mother and son, respectively, in April 2020. Billy Bryk, in December 2020, and Alisha Boe, in January 2021, joined the cast in undisclosed roles. In November 2020, pre-production took place in Albuquerque, New Mexico, while production began in January 2021, followed by principal photography in February 2021. Filming concluded in March 2021.

Release 
The film premiered at the Sundance Film Festival on January 20, 2022. Its first trailer was released on November 29, 2022. The film was released in the United States on January 20, 2023.

Reception

References

External links 
 
 
 
 
 

2022 comedy-drama films
2022 directorial debut films
2020s English-language films
A24 (company) films
American comedy-drama films
2022 independent films
Films shot in New Mexico
2020s American films
Films about mother–son relationships
American coming-of-age comedy-drama films
2020s coming-of-age comedy-drama films